Carl Oscar (or Oskar) Borg (March 3, 1879 – May 8, 1947) was a Swedish-born painter who settled in the United States and became known for views of California and the SouthWest.

Biography

Carl Oscar Borg was born into a poor family in Grinstad parish, Dalsland province, Sweden. Oscar Borg moved to London at age 15 to assist portrait and marine artist George Johansen. In 1901, he sailed for the United States. Borg taught art at the California Art Institute in Los Angeles and at the Santa Barbara School of the Arts. He became a  protégé of American philanthropist and art patron Phoebe Hearst. She gave him the opportunity to return to Europe to study art.

Borg was influenced by the nature of the southwestern United States, especially the states of Arizona and New Mexico.  He worked  in various mediums including oil, watercolor, etchings, and woodblock. He was commissioned to paint posters for the railway company, Atchison, Topeka and Santa Fe Railway. His posters were put up on the company's sales offices and attracted attention. He was known for his dramatic paintings of the Grand Canyon.

Borg was a founding member of the Painter's Club of Los Angeles and the California Art Club. He was one of the first  art directors  for a major movie studio in Hollywood. He worked with the production of silent films in the years 1925–1928.  Examples of his art are on display at Brigham Young University, Harvard University, Smithsonian American Art Museum and the Fine Arts Museums of San Francisco. His work was also part of the painting event in the art competition at the 1936 Summer Olympics.

Personal life
Borg was married to Lily Borg Elmberg. He was a member of the National Academy of Design, the National Academy of Arts, Société Nationale des Beaux-Arts  and the Salmagundi Club.

Selected works
The Great Southwest Etchings   (1936)

References

Other sources
Widén, Albin  Carl Oscar Borg; Ett Konstnarsode  (Nordisk Rotogravyr. 1953)
Laird, Helen Carl Oscar Borg and the Magic Region: Artist of the American West (Peregrine Smith Books. 1986)
Schulz, Marlene R. Carl Oscar Borg: California Images  (Santa Barbara Historical Society.  1990)
Cuba, Stanley L. Carl Oscar Borg, Chronicler of the Southwest  (Western Art Digest. 1986)

External links
Carl Oscar Borg scrapbooks at the Smithsonian Archives of American Art
Carl Oscar Borg Artist and Gallery web site
Art Signature Dictionary, genuine signature by the artist Carl Oscar Borg Here are several examples of Carl Oscar Borg's signature.

1879 births
1947 deaths
19th-century Swedish painters
Swedish male painters
20th-century Swedish painters
20th-century Swedish male artists
19th-century American painters
American male painters
20th-century American male artists
20th-century American painters
Swedish emigrants to the United States
19th-century Swedish male artists
19th-century American male artists
Olympic competitors in art competitions